Belaturricula ergata is a species of sea snail, a marine gastropod mollusk in the family Borsoniidae.

Description
The length of the shell attains 32 mm.

Distribution
This species occurs in the Antarctic waters of the Scotia Sea. and the Weddell Sea.

References

 Hedley, C., 1916. Mollusca. Australian Antarctic Expedition, Ser. C, Zoology and Botany, 4 (1): 1-80. 
 Engl W. (2012) Shells of Antarctica. Hackenheim: Conchbooks. 402 pp. 
  Bouchet P., Kantor Yu.I., Sysoev A. & Puillandre N. (2011) A new operational classification of the Conoidea. Journal of Molluscan Studies 77: 273-308.
 Kantor, Yuri I., Myroslaw G. Harasewych, and Nicolas Puillandre. "A critical review of Antarctic Conoidea (Neogastropoda)." Molluscan Research 36.3 (2016): 153–206.

External links
  Aldea & Troncoso: Systematics and distribution of shelled molluscs (Gastropoda, Bivalvia and Scaphopoda) from the South Shetlands to the Bellinghausen Sea, West Antarctica; Iberus : revista de la Sociedad Española de Malacología v.26 (2008)
 Aldea, Cristian, Celia Olabarria, and Jesús S. Troncoso. "Spatial patterns of benthic diversity in molluscs from West Antarctica." Antarctic Science 21.04 (2009): 341-353.
 Troncoso, Jesús S., and Cristian Aldea. "Macrobenthic mollusc assemblages and diversity in the West Antarctica from the South Shetland Islands to the Bellingshausen Sea." Polar Biology 31.10 (2008): 1253-1265
 Schiaparelli, Stefano, Anne-Nina Lörz, and Riccardo Cattaneo-Vietti. "Diversity and distribution of mollusc assemblages on the Victoria Land coast and the Balleny Islands, Ross Sea, Antarctica." Antarctic Science 18.04 (2006): 615-631
 MNHN, Paris: Belaturricula ergata

ergata
Gastropods described in 1916